The Adams political family was a leading family in the politics and intellectual life of the United States in the 18th and 19th centuries.

Adams family may also refer to:
The Adams family of removable dental appliance retention components that consists of the Adams clasp and associated components
The Adams family, London-based criminal family that established the Clerkenwell crime syndicate
The Adams family abuse controversy, political controversy in Northern Ireland surrounding allegations of child abuse in the family of Sinn Féin leader Gerry Adams
The Adams family, a filmmaking and musical family who produced, directed and starred in Hellbender and other films

See also
Adams (surname)
The Addams Family, group of fictional characters created by American cartoonist Charles Addams
The Addams Family (disambiguation)